Alex Neil, Alexander Neill, or variant may refer to:

Neil
Alex Neil (footballer) (born 1981), Scottish football player and manager (Hamilton Academical, Norwich City, Preston North End)
Alex Neil (politician) (born 1951), Scottish politician

Neill
A. S. Neill a.k.a. Alexander Sutherland Neill (1883–1973), Scottish progressive educator, author and founder of Summerhill school
Alec Neill a.k.a. Alexander George Neill (born 1950), New Zealand politician

See also

Alex McNeill (fl. 1890s), Scottish footballer 
Alexander McNeill (1842–1932), Canadian politician
Alexander McNeill (New Zealand politician) (1833–1915), New Zealand politician